Riddle is a city in Douglas County, Oregon, United States. The population was 1,185 at the 2010 census.

History
Riddle was founded by John Bouseman Riddle, the son of William H. Riddle, for whom the town was named. William H. Riddle was a native of Springfield, Illinois, who settled in the area in 1851. By 1881, the Southern Pacific Railroad line south of Roseburg had a station here called "Riddlesburg", which was changed to "Riddles" in 1882 and to "Riddle" in 1889. A post office at this location opened under the name of "Riddles" in 1882 and was changed to "Riddle" in 1910.

J. B. Riddle purchased a land claim from J.Q.C. VanDenbosch at the age of nineteen in the year 1863. In 1869, Riddle sold 140.5 acres of his claim to his brother, Abner. When the railroad came through, it passed between the brothers' properties. J.B. took advantage of the opportunity afforded by the railroad and changed his profession to business from farming. He and his second wife, Mary Catching, built a hotel in what would become the city of Riddle, where J.B. opened several small eating houses to Medford, Oregon along the tracks.

Demographics

2010 census
As of the 2010 census, there were 1,185 people, 460 households, and 307 families residing in the city. The racial makeup of the city was 89.7% White, 0.3% African American, 3.0% Native American, 0.5% Asian, 0.1% Pacific Islander, 1.2% from other races, and 5.2% from two or more races. Hispanic or Latino of any race were 5.1% of the population.

There were 460 households, of which 36.5% had children under the age of 18 living with them. Married couples living together constituted 44.8%, while 17.0% had a female householder with no husband present, 5.0% had a male householder with no wife present, and 33.3% were non-families. Individuals made up 25.2% of all households, and 8.9% had someone living alone who was 65 years of age or older. The average household size was 2.57 people and the average family size was 3.01.

The median age in the city was 36.6 years. Residents were under the age of 18 made up 25.4% of the population; 9.7% were between the ages of 18 and 24; 25.3% were from 25 to 44; 28.2% were from 45 to 64; and 11.4% were 65 years of age or older. The gender makeup of the city was 48.9% male and 51.1% female.

2000 census
As of the census of 2000, there were 1,014 people, 381 households, and 265 families residing in the city. The population density was 1,519.6 people per square mile (584.3/km2). There were 406 housing units at an average density of 608.5 per square mile (234.0/km2). The racial makeup of the city was 94.48% White, 2.27% Native American, 0.1% Asian, 0.2% from other races, and 2.96% from two or more races. Hispanic or Latino of any race were 1.97% of the population.

There were 381 households, out of which 36.0% had children under the age of 18 living with them, 50.4% were married couples living together, 13.6% had a female householder with no husband present, and 30.2% were non-families. Individuals made up 24.4% of all households, and 10% had someone living alone who was 65 years of age or older. The average household size was 2.66 people and the average family size was 3.15.

In the city, the population was spread out, with 31.2% under the age of 18, 9.4% from 18 to 24, 25.7% from 25 to 44, 21.8% from 45 to 64, and 11.9% who were 65 years of age or older. The median age was 33 years. For every 100 females, there were 96.1 males. For every 100 females age 18 and over, there were 84.7 males.

The median income for a household in the city was $28,750, and the median income for a family was $37,159. Males had a median income of $31,438 versus $27,232 for females. The per capita income for the city was $13,666. About 16.1% of families and 19.0% of the population were below the poverty line, including 21.1% of those under age 18 and 10.6% of those age 65 or over.

Geography
Cow Creek flows by Riddle before entering the nearby South Umpqua River.

Climate
Riddle has a warm-summer Mediterranean climate (Csb) according to the Köppen climate classification system. Summers are cool during the mornings but become hot by afternoon, whilst winters are chilly, if not severe, and rainy. The hottest afternoon has been  on June 27, 2021, and the hottest morning  on June 28, 2015.

During winter, most days feature westerly surface and aloft winds, although rainfall is restricted by the coastal mountains. On rare occasions, a block in the Gulf of Alaska will drive cold air from the continent west of the Sierra/Cascade crest, producing much colder than normal weather with either snow or clear skies.

Economy

The Riddle area was known for nickel mining, with several square miles of nickel-bearing garnierite surface deposits nearby. The mine closed in 1987.

Education
The Riddle School District provides primary and secondary public education in the city. The district operates Riddle Elementary School and Riddle Junior/Senior High School.

References

Further reading

 John M. Cornutt, Cow Creek Valley Memories: Riddle Pioneers Remembered in John M. Cornutt's Autobiography. Eugene, OR: Industrial Publishing Co., 1971.

External links
 Entry for Riddle in the Oregon Blue Book

Cities in Oregon
Cities in Douglas County, Oregon
1893 establishments in Oregon
Populated places established in 1893